Celtic started the 2007–08 season looking to retain the Scottish Premier League title and the Scottish Cup. They also competed in the Scottish League Cup. The team accepted an invitation to take part in the annual Major League Soccer All-Star Game for 2007, as part of a pre-season tour of the United States, Switzerland and England. On 9 October, Celtic opened their new training facilities at Lennoxtown.

Domestic campaign
Celtic started the season with a scoreless draw at Celtic Park against Kilmarnock. They then won their next five league matches scoring 12 goals in six consecutive matches and topped the league for most of the first half of the season. At the end of 2007 Celtic were still on top of the SPL standings. The Old Firm derby on 2 January 2008 and a match against Motherwell were postponed due to the death of former Celtic player and Motherwell captain Phil O'Donnell, who died on 29 December. During the break in fixtures, the team slipped to second place behind Rangers. Celtic kept in close touch with Rangers until the 2nd Old Firm derby on 31 March 2008 at Ibrox. In contrast to the first Old Firm game at Ibrox in September, in which Rangers coasted to a 3–0 win, this was a close game which finished 1–0 to Rangers, courtesy of a Kevin Thomson goal just before half-time. This put Rangers seven points clear at the top of the SPL. Celtic suffered another set-back when they lost their next game at home to Motherwell by the same scoreline. With their closest rivals seven points ahead, and with a game in hand, coupled with the success Rangers were enjoying in all competitions, many fans began to doubt Gordon Strachan, a doubt which was clearly expressed throughout Celtic Park during the game against Motherwell, when Strachan decided to take off Scott McDonald, the club's leading goalscorer for Georgios Samaras in the final 15 minutes.

However a dramatic, and seemingly unlikely, turnaround in fortunes began on 16 April, when the third Old Firm clash took place in Celtic Park. This was a highly charged affair from the kick-off, with a re-invigorated Celtic dominating the opening proceedings and making their dominance count when Shunsuke Nakamura scored a spectacular goal from around 35 yards, which later ended up as Celtic's 'Goal of the Season', on the 20-minute mark. Rangers hit back in the second half when Nacho Novo equalised but Celtic got a chance to retake the lead when Nakamura's curling shot was illegally handled off the line by Carlos Cuéllar, who was sent off. However, McDonald's penalty was struck poorly and Allan McGregor, despite having an injured ankle, was able to save it. Celtic pushed in vain for a winner against 10 men but it seemed like Rangers would get the draw they played for, and which would all but seem to secure them the title. However, in the third minute of injury time, a quick throw in led to ball being played outside the box to Samaras who knocked it down to Gary Caldwell. Caldwell hit a diagonal ball into the box where McDonald squared the ball for Jan Vennegoor of Hesselink to nod the ball home inside the six-yard box past Neil Alexander, who replaced the injured McGregor. However spectacular Nakamura's first half goal was, Vennegoor of Hesselink's proved to be a hugely pivotal moment in the title race. There were jubilant scenes around all the Celtic fans. McDonald was visibly emotional after the final whistle. 2–1 was the final score and even with the small confrontations after the final whistle between the players, Celtic showed that they were not giving up their title without a fight.

On 27 April, the fourth and final Old Firm clash was played at Celtic Park. Picking up from 11 days earlier, the game exploded into life with a fourth-minute strike from McDonald. The goal was later shown by TV replays to have been offside, however Celtic were not going to let this good fortune pass them by. Rangers equalised in the 17th minute with a David Weir header from a corner kick and Celtic's set-piece weakness was exploited again less than 15 minutes later when Daniel Cousin scored from another corner kick. Shortly before half time though, Aiden McGeady found Scott McDonald just inside the Rangers box. He turned Christian Dailly and struck a looping shot past Neil Alexander to make it 2–2. The second half saw both teams have plenty of chances and Celtic were given a penalty after Kirk Broadfoot brought down McDonald. Barry Robson took the responsibility and duly delivered by driving the ball past Alexander. It remained 3–2 and Celtic went five points clear in the SPL, however due to fixture congestion, Rangers had played three matches fewer.

Celtic's chances of winning the title improved over the following weeks when Rangers drew consecutive games against Hibernian and Motherwell. Going into the last day of the league season, the clubs were tied on points although Celtic had a superior goal difference. Celtic travelled to Tannadice Park to play Dundee United, knowing that victory would give them the title while Rangers travelled to Pittodrie to play Aberdeen, needing Celtic to fail to win against Dundee United to have any chance at all. The game at Tannadice was a tense affair with chances for both sides. During the second half, Celtic supporters had found out that Aberdeen had taken the lead against Rangers and shortly after that, Vennegoor of Hesselink connected with a corner to give Celtic the lead that would secure the title. Gordon Strachan became only the third Celtic manager ever to win three league titles in a row. The victory was dedicated to the memory of Tommy Burns, former player and manager, who had died earlier that week. Victory in the league also secured Celtic automatic entry to the group stages of the UEFA Champions League in season 2008/09.

The club were less successful in the season's domestic cup competitions. They exited the Scottish League Cup at the quarter final stage, after suffering a 2–0 defeat to Hearts. They lost at the same stage of the Scottish Cup, losing to Aberdeen in a replay.

UEFA Champions League campaign 

Celtic was drawn against Russian side Spartak Moscow in the third round of qualifying for the Champions League. The first leg was played at the Luzhniki Stadium in Moscow, the venue for this year's Champions League final, and ended in a 1–1 draw, with Paul Hartley scoring his first goal for the club after joining from Heart of Midlothian eight months prior. In the return leg, Celtic emerged victorious after a 1–1 draw, with Scott McDonald scoring his first goal for the club. The game ended in a penalty shootout, with Artur Boruc saving twice.

Celtic were drawn alongside Milan, Benfica and Shakhtar Donetsk in the Champions League group stages. Celtic lost the first group match, away to Shakhtar in Ukraine, 2–0, but they rebounded with a 2–1 win over defending champions Milan at Celtic Park, leaving them in second in the group after two matches. Following McDonald's match-winning goal, Celtic fan Robert McHendry ran onto the pitch and tapped Milan goalkeeper Dida on the face as he ran past his goal; Dida initially gave chase, then fell to the pitch and was stretchered off. McHendry later surrendered to police and was banned for life from Parkhead, and Dida received a two-game suspension for breaching UEFA's policy of "principles of loyalty, integrity and sportsmanship", which was reduced to one match on appeal. Celtic were found guilty of "lack of organisation and improper conduct of supporters" and were issued a £25,000 fine, half of which was suspended for two years.

The third match day saw Celtic drop to bottom in the game against Benfica. Celtic lost 1–0 with the goal coming in the 86th minute. Next up, Celtic again faced Benfica, this time at home. They won this 1–0 with a goal from Aiden McGeady before half-time. In the next game at Celtic Park, they came back from 1–0 down against Shakhtar Donetsk to win 2–1 thanks to a winner from Massimo Donati with the last kick of the game, which moved them up to second in the group, guaranteeing post-Christmas European football, and leaving them needing one point from the last game in Milan to be sure of qualifying for the round of 16. Despite losing 1–0 in Milan, Celtic qualified as Benfica won 2–1 in Donetsk. In the knockout stage, Celtic drew Barcelona, where Celtic lost both the first leg at home (3–2) and the second leg and the second leg (1–0) away at Camp Nou.

Results

Scottish Premier League

UEFA Champions League

*Celtic won the match 4–3 on penalties

Scottish League Cup

Scottish Cup

Player statistics

Appearances and goals

List of squad players, including number of appearances by competition

|}

Team statistics

League table

Technical staff

Transfers

In

Out

See also
 List of Celtic F.C. seasons

References 

Celtic F.C. seasons
Celtic
Scottish football championship-winning seasons